Walter Souza Braga Netto (born 11 March 1957) is a Brazilian army general and former Minister of Defence. Braga was Commander of the Eastern Military Command and, until 31 December 2018, Federal Interventor in the Public Security of the state of Rio de Janeiro. He unsuccessfully ran for Vice President of Brazil as running mate of Jair Bolsonaro in 2022, narrowly losing to Luiz Inácio Lula da Silva and Geraldo Alckmin.

Early life 
Braga Netto was born on 11 March 1957 in Belo Horizonte.

Military career
Enlisted on 17 February 1975, Braga Netto enrolled in the Academia Militar das Agulhas Negras (AMAN) where, on 14 December 1978, he was declared an Officer Aspirant. Braga was promoted to second lieutenant on 31 August 1979, to first lieutenant on 25 December 1980, and to captain on 25 December 1984.

Senior officer
As lieutenant colonel, Braga Netto served as assistant of Sub-Secretariat of Programs and Project of the Secretariat of Strategic Affairs of the Presidency of the Republic. On 2 February 2001, he was nominated Cabinet Officer of then-Army Commander, Gleuber Vieira.

On 9 July 2001, Braga Netto was nominated commander of the 1st Regiment of Combat Cars (1° RCC), still headquartered in Rio de Janeiro. He was promoted to colonel on 17 December 2001.

He was nominated Defence and Army Attaché to the Brazilian Embassy in Poland, a position he held from 1 February 2005 to 1 February 2007.

General officer
Promoted to brigadier general in November 2009, he was nominated Staff-Chief of the Western Military Command on 23 November.

In 2011, he was designated military attaché of the Army to the Brazilian Embassy in the United States, also accredited to Canada.

On 31 March 2013, he was promoted to Divisional general. On 21 August, he was nominated General Coordinated of the Special Advisory of the Olympic and Paralympic Games Rio 2016. On 25 November 2015, Walter Braga became commander of the 1st Military Region, leaving the Coordination.

On 31 July 2016, he was promoted to Army general and nominated Commander of the Eastern Military Command.

On 16 February 2018, General Braga Netto was nominated Federal Interventor in the Public Security of Rio de Janeiro by President Michel Temer, position he held until the end of the year. Over the course of 10 months, Braga Netto took command of the state of Rio de Janeiro’s police forces with Army troops deployed for internal use against the civilian population. In relation to the previous year, the period of intervention registered an increase of almost 40 percent in killings committed by police officers.

On 29 March 2019, took office as Staff-Chief of the Army.

Bolsonaro Government 
On 12 February 2020, he was invited by President Jair Bolsonaro for the position of Chief of Staff of the Presidency. On March 31, 2021, after the joint resignation of the commanders of the three branches of the Brazilian armed forces, Minister of Defense, and other leaders in the Brazilian military, Braga Netto was appointed as the new Minister of Defense.

Braga Netto drew controversy shortly after his appointment after expressing support for the military dictatorship in Brazil.

COVID-19 pandemic 

On May 26, 2020, a report from Reuters revealed that as the Health Ministry of Brazil began taking preventative measures against the COVID-19 pandemic on March 13, Bolsonaro intervened and scaled back their procedures within 24 hours. By March 16, Bolsonaro discreetly shifted power from the ministry to Braga Netto's Casa Civil, with the given reason being that "the pandemic 'transcended' public health".

In August 2020, Braga Netto was diagnosed with COVID-19.

2022 presidential election 
On June 26, 2022, he was chosen to be incumbent president Jair Bolsonaro's running mate for the 2022 presidential election. It was announced by Bolsonaro during an interview given to journalists Rodrigo Constantino, Luís Ernesto Lacombe, Augusto Nunes and Ana Paula Henkel at the Programa 4 por 4 independent show.

References

|-

|-

1957 births
Living people
Brazilian generals
People from Belo Horizonte
Defence ministers of Brazil
Chiefs of Staff of Brazil
Liberal Party (Brazil, 2006) politicians
Candidates for Vice President of Brazil